The following outline is provided as an overview of and topical guide to chocolate:

What is chocolate? 
 Chocolate – raw or processed food produced from the seed of the tropical Theobroma cacao tree. The seeds of the cacao tree have an intense bitter taste, and must be fermented to improve the flavour. Chocolate is a popular ingredient in confectionery items and candies.

What type of thing is chocolate?
Chocolate is a type of:
 Food – substance to provide nutritional support for the body, ingested by an organism and assimilated by the organism's cells in an effort to produce energy, maintain life, and/or stimulate growth.
Confectionery – the set of food items that are rich in sugar, any one or type of which is called a confection. Modern usage may include substances rich in artificial sweeteners as well.
 Candy –  confection made from a concentrated solution of sugar in water, to which flavourings and colourants are added. Candies come in numerous colours and varieties and have a long history in popular culture.
 Ingredient  – substance that forms part of a mixture (in a general sense). For example, in cooking, recipes specify which ingredients are used to prepare a specific dish.  Chocolate is often used as an ingredient in dessert items, such as cakes and cookies.

What is chocolate made of?

Necessary ingredients

Substances found in cacao 
 
 
 
 
 Phenethylamine – psychoactive drug that is usually inactive when orally ingested because most of it is metabolized into phenylacetic acid by monoamine oxidase (MAO), preventing significant concentrations from reaching the brain
 Theobromine – also known as xantheose, it contains no bromine and has a similar, but lesser, effect to caffeine
 Theophylline – methylxanthine drug found in tea leaves

Source of the cocoa bean 

 

Forastero  – 80% made with this tree group

Optional ingredients

Ingredients of white chocolate

Types 

 
 
 
 
 
 
 
  – a chocolate brand containing coffee and cola nut
 
 Unsweetened chocolate – pure chocolate liquor mixed with fat to produce a solid substance; also known as "bitter", "baking chocolate" and "cooking chocolate"

Production methods

Producers and trade organizations

 
 
  – a Ghanaian cocoa processing company
 
  – a Ghanaian farmers' cooperative organisation

Brands

Edibles 
 Brand names:
 
 
 
 
 
 
 Cereals
 
 
 
 
 
 
 Chocolate 
 
 Chocolate 
 
 
 
 
 
 
 
 
 
 
 
 
 
 
 Chocolates –

Drinks

History

Effects on health

Other articles 

 
  – named for its colour, does not contain cocoa

References

External links 

 
 The Food of the Gods  A Popular Account of Cocoa – Freely downloadable book from Project Gutenberg

Chocolate
Chocolate